Aigualluts is a karst formation and waterfall in the Province of Huesca, northeastern Spain.  It lies along the Ésera River, at 2074 m above sea level on Pico Aneto.

Description 
A walk of just an hour and a half in total duration, essential for anyone who travels to the Benasque Valley for the first time, being probably the most visited place in this valley. The Forau de Aiguallut is a chasm through which the waters from the Aneto glacier disappear to resurface again in the Val d'Aran, in the Garonne river basin, which flows into the Atlantic Sea in the French city of Bordeaux. Before its disappearance, the waters coming from the Aneto glacier flow into the great meadow of the Plan d’Aigualluts, where it meanders in small meanders until it falls through the colorful Aiguallut waterfall which flows directly into the great chasm of Aiguallut.

References

Geography of the Province of Huesca
Waterfalls of Spain
Landforms of Aragon